Holy Trinity Catholic Church is a Roman Catholic church of the Archdiocese of Dubuque, located in Luxemburg, Iowa.

The parish dates back to the 1850s when families living in the area requested a church from Diocesan officials.  Construction on the current church building began in 1874 and was completed in 1875.  The church later became part of the St. LaSalle Pastorate - which is a parish that covers the churches in the Iowa towns of Luxemburg, Balltown, Holy Cross, Rickardsville, and Sherrill.

On August 9, 2010, the church was damaged in a fire which destroyed the steeple.  Shortly after 2am, it's believed that lightning struck the steeple and ignited the blaze.  Firefighters from several communities responded, and while the steeple was destroyed they were able to keep the fire from spreading to the church itself.

References

Roman Catholic churches completed in 1875
19th-century Roman Catholic church buildings in the United States
Churches in the Roman Catholic Archdiocese of Dubuque
German-American history
German-American culture in Iowa
Churches in Dubuque County, Iowa